The 2002 Grand Prix de Denain was the 44th edition of the Grand Prix de Denain cycle race and was held on 25 April 2002. The race was won by Alberto Vinale.

General classification

References

2002
2002 in road cycling
2002 in French sport
April 2002 sports events in France